eX-Board is a proprietary arcade system board released in 2008 by the Japanese company Examu.

Hardware Specification 
CPU: Fanless Via C7 NanoBGA2 (X86 architecture)
Chipset: Via CN700, VT8237R Plus
Memory: 1 GB DDR2 SDRAM (with VRAM sharing)
Video: Integrated S3 UniChrome Pro AGP graphics with MPEG-2 decoding acceleration
Audio: VIA VT1618Cidec 192 kHz/32-bit 8 channel AC’97
Network: RJ-45 10/100Mbit/s ethernet
Video I/O: JAMMA output; D-Sub 15-pin X 2/composite terminal/terminal
S-Video: (able to connect simultaneously)
Sound I/O: JAMMA output/ left/right voice output terminal X 2
Input: Operators are able to add buttons with JAMMA input
USB: Two USB 2.0 ports
Power: JAMMA supply 12 V 5 A; or special power supply adaptor with 100-240 V AC 50/60 Hz 1.7 A
Size: W 317.8 mm × D 250 mm × H 104.2 mm
Weight: 4 kg
Operating System: Microsoft Windows XP Embedded
Flash Disk: 512 MB / 1 GB / 2 GB

source:

List of games
The games are mostly 2D fighting and were developed by Examu Inc.

References

External links 
 eX-Board Official Website
 Small retrospective at New Astro City's wordpress blog (MAY 13, 2014 BY HSBALLINA)

Arcade system boards
x86-based computers